Belding's yellowthroat (Geothlypis beldingi) is a New World warbler. It is a resident breeder endemic to the  southern Baja California Peninsula (Mexico).

It is closely related to common yellowthroat, Altamira yellowthroat and Bahama yellowthroat, with which it forms a superspecies, and was formerly considered conspecific.

The breeding habitat is freshwater marshes and lagoons, usually with cattails. It builds a cup nest of dead cattails which is usually attached to low on the stem of a living cattail. It lays 2-4 eggs, usually 3.  Like other yellowthroats it forages low in vegetation and feeds on insects and other small invertebrates.

The Belding's yellowthroat is 14 cm long with an olive-green back and bright yellow belly. The adult male of the southern nominate race G. b. beldingi has yellow underparts, a black facemask and yellow forecrown. The female is similar, but lacks the black mask and has an olive crown. It is similar to Altamira yellowthroat, but separated from it by the width of Mexico. This race has been drastically affected by habitat loss, and is now restricted to several small marshes in southernmost Baja California [the estero at San Jose del Cabo and the lagoon at Todo Santos; August, 2007].

The male of the northern subspecies G. b.goldmaii has a pale belly and grey forecrown, making it very similar to some non-migratory southwestern races of common yellowthroat, which, however, do not overlap in range. It is larger and slightly brighter than the migratory races of common yellowthroat which winter in Baja California, and the male's mask extends further onto the nape than is the case with the visitors. This race is still fairly common, but its range is shrinking through habitat loss.

The song of Belding's yellowthroat is a loud wichety wichety wichety wich, similar to that of common yellowthroat but deeper, fuller, and with some buzzes. The call is a soft jip, again similar to common yellowthroat.

This species is named for Lyman Belding, a prominent Californian naturalist.

References

New World Warblers by Curson, Quinn and Beadle,

External links
BirdLife Species Factsheet 

Belding's Yellowthroat
Endemic birds of Western Mexico
Endemic fauna of the Baja California Peninsula
Belding's yellowthroat
Taxa named by Robert Ridgway